James Mark Bittner (born 2 February 1982) is an English former professional footballer who played as a goalkeeper. He is currently the goalkeeping coach at Reading.

Career
Bittner signed for Fulham in 2000 from Swindon Town by then manager Jean Tigana and spent two years at the club.

After spending time at Bournemouth and Queens Park Rangers he signed for Exeter City, playing 42 times for the club. This was then followed by two injury-plagued years at Torquay United and Woking.

After recovering from a long-term shoulder injury Bittner then joined Salisbury City in 2007. He played 86 games in three seasons at the club. He was loaned out to Chippenham Town for a month in September 2007 for a month after recovering from a broken finger.

Bittner joined Forest Green Rovers in 2010 and was awarded with the Supporters Player of the Season trophy for his performances in his first season at The New Lawn. In May 2011, Bittner signed a new contract until the summer of 2013. He stated after signing the new contract: "I had a couple of offers but there was no chance of me leaving. The club is financially sound now and with the gaffer (Dave Hockaday) and the chairman (Dale Vince) on board – the future is really bright." Manager Hockaday added: "James is as good as there is in the league and I am delighted to have him on board."

Bittner left for Hereford United in 2012, making 42 appearances, before joining Newport County on a short-term contract. After leaving Newport, he returned to Salisbury for a second spell as player coach.

Bittner signed for Plymouth Argyle in July 2014 as second-choice goalkeeper behind Luke McCormick. Bittner made his Plymouth Argyle debut on 24 January 2015, replacing the injured McCormick at half time. The match ended in a 1–1 draw.

In July 2015 Bittner signed a new player/coach contract with Plymouth Argyle after agreeing to take the role of the club's new goalkeeper coach under new manager Derek Adams.

On 16 June 2016, Bittner re-joined Newport County as goalkeeper player/coach under manager Warren Feeney. When Feeney and his assistant manager Andy Todd were sacked on 28 September 2016, Bittner and fellow first team coach Sean McCarthy were named joint caretaker managers. Their only matches in charge were a 2–1 home defeat against Swansea City Under 23's in the League Trophy fixture on 4 October 2016  and a League Two 0–0 draw versus Colchester United on 8 October 2016. Graham Westley was appointed team manager effective from 10 October 2016 with Dino Maamria his assistant manager and Mccarthy released by the club. Bittner made his debut for Newport County on 22 October 2016 versus Plymouth Argyle replacing Joe Day in the 36th minute when Day was sent off. Plymouth won the match 3–1  In June 2017 Bittner signed a one-year contract extension and he was released by Newport at the end of the 2017–18 season.

In July 2018 Bittner joined Reading as their Under 23 goalkeeping coach. In October 2019 he was appointed the first team goalkeeper coach of Reading.

References

External links
 

1982 births
Living people
People from Devizes
English footballers
Association football goalkeepers
Newport County A.F.C. managers
Fulham F.C. players
AFC Bournemouth players
Queens Park Rangers F.C. players
Exeter City F.C. players
Torquay United F.C. players
Woking F.C. players
Salisbury City F.C. players
Chippenham Town F.C. players
Forest Green Rovers F.C. players
Hereford United F.C. players
Newport County A.F.C. players
Bath City F.C. players
Plymouth Argyle F.C. players
English Football League players
England semi-pro international footballers
English football managers